Golden aster or goldenaster is a common name for several plants with yellow flowers in the aster family and may refer to:

Chrysopsis, species are generally called "golden asters"
Heterotheca, includes some species previously classified in Chrysopsis and called "golden asters"

See also
False golden aster, a common name for some species of Heterotheca

Astereae